Gloria Parmentier (born March 22, 1958) is an American sports shooter. She competed in the women's 50 metre rifle three positions event at the 1984 Summer Olympics.

References

External links
 

1958 births
Living people
American female sport shooters
Olympic shooters of the United States
Shooters at the 1984 Summer Olympics
Sportspeople from Columbus, Georgia
Pan American Games medalists in shooting
Pan American Games silver medalists for the United States
Shooters at the 1983 Pan American Games
Medalists at the 1983 Pan American Games
21st-century American women
20th-century American women